Elections to Coleraine Borough Council were held on 5 May 2005 on the same day as the other Northern Irish local government elections. The election used four district electoral areas to elect a total of 22 councillors.

Election results

Note: "Votes" are the first preference votes.

Districts summary

|- class="unsortable" align="centre"
!rowspan=2 align="left"|Ward
! % 
!Cllrs
! % 
!Cllrs
! %
!Cllrs
! %
!Cllrs
! % 
!Cllrs
! % 
!Cllrs
!rowspan=2|TotalCllrs
|- class="unsortable" align="center"
!colspan=2 bgcolor="" | DUP
!colspan=2 bgcolor="" | UUP
!colspan=2 bgcolor="" | SDLP
!colspan=2 bgcolor="" | Sinn Féin
!colspan=2 bgcolor="" | Alliance
!colspan=2 bgcolor="white"| Others
|-
|align="left"|Bann
|bgcolor="#D46A4C"|34.0
|bgcolor="#D46A4C"|2
|33.6
|2
|19.6
|1
|12.8
|1
|0.0
|0
|0.0
|0
|6
|-
|align="left"|Coleraine Central
|33.8
|2
|bgcolor="40BFF5"|37.6
|bgcolor="40BFF5"|3
|10.9
|1
|5.7
|0
|6.1
|0
|5.9
|0
|6
|-
|align="left"|Coleraine East
|bgcolor="#D46A4C"|57.5
|bgcolor="#D46A4C"|3
|29.2
|2
|5.7
|0
|3.0
|0
|4.6
|0
|0.0
|0
|5
|-
|align="left"|The Skerries
|bgcolor="#D46A4C"|28.1
|bgcolor="#D46A4C"|2
|24.4
|1
|8.9
|1
|7.5
|0
|9.7
|0
|21.4
|1
|5
|-
|- class="unsortable" class="sortbottom" style="background:#C9C9C9"
|align="left"| Total
|36.9
|9
|32.0
|8
|12.3
|3
|7.9
|1
|4.7
|0
|6.2
|1
|22
|-
|}

District results

Bann

2001: 3 x UUP, 2 x SDLP, 1 x DUP
2005: 2 x DUP, 2 x UUP, 1 x Sinn Féin, 1 x SDLP
2001-2005 Change: DUP and Sinn Féin gain from UUP and SDLP

Coleraine Central

2001: 3 x UUP, 2 x DUP, 1 x SDLP
2005: 3 x UUP, 2 x DUP, 1 x SDLP
2001-2005 Change: No change

Coleraine East

2001: 3 x DUP, 2 x UUP
2005: 3 x DUP, 2 x UUP
2001-2005 Change: No change

The Skerries

2001: 2 x UUP, 1 x DUP, 1 x SDLP, 1 x Independent
2005: 2 x DUP, 1 x UUP, 1 x SDLP, 1 x Independent
2001-2005 Change: DUP gain from UUP

References

Coleraine Borough Council elections
Coleraine